The total population of the Nair community is disputed, since there has been no caste-based census since 1931. The administrators of the British Raj had an abiding interest in ethnography but in post-independence India the policy has been generally to ignore it in censuses.

The 1968 Socio-Economic Survey by the Government of Kerala gave the population of the Nair community as 14.41% of the total population of the state. But various sources cite figures ranging from 15%, 16%, 17.5%, 19% and 20%. There is also the practical difficulty of certain Nair subcastes declaring as independent caste. Out of those citizens who are eligible to vote in Kerala, 15% belong to the Nair community.

Nair population has been declining in Kerala. Some of the districts in Kerala have only a small population of Nairs. Malappuram has a Nair population of 1.8% and Kasargode has about 2.1%.

The most reliable population figures comes from two sources. The BCRC estimated Nair population at 14.47% of the total population of Kerala based on a statewide sample survey conducted for the reservation of seats in educational institutions. At the same time, the government for the same purpose, gave a figure of 15.35% based on the Census of Travancore in 1941, Census of Cochin in 1941 & Census of Malabar in 1921. This figure will be true if the population growth rate is uniform for all the ethnic groups in Kerala. But this is not the case, as according to the 1941 Census, the Total Fertility Rate varied across various ethnic groups. In 1941, Kammalas had the highest TFR at 3.88 children per woman. They were followed by Ezhavas at 3.84, Syrians at 3.79, Muslims at 3.71 and Nadars at 3.64 children per woman. On the other hand, Nairs had a TFR of only 3.63 children per woman. Below the Nairs were Pulayas (3.43 each), Parayas (3.23), Brahmins (3.13) and Kuravas (3.13).

Population estimates
Household sample surveys conducted by the Kerala Statistical Institute, the last of which were in 2000, produced estimates which are:

Distribution of Nair population in Kerala.

References

D
Demographics of India